Eelis Konstantin Rantanen (5 March 1879, Turku – 26 June 1946) was a Finnish schoolteacher and politician. He was a member of the Parliament of Finland from 1921 to 1922, representing the Christian Workers' Union of Finland (SKrTL).

References

1879 births
1946 deaths
People from Turku
People from Turku and Pori Province (Grand Duchy of Finland)
Christian Workers' Union of Finland politicians
Members of the Parliament of Finland (1919–22)
Finnish schoolteachers